The 2021/22 FIS Nordic Combined Continental Cup was the 38th Continental Cup season, organized by the International Ski Federation. It started on 25 November 2021 in Nizhniy Tagil, Russia, and concluded on 27 March 2021 in Lake Placid, United States.

On 1 March 2022, following the 2022 Russian invasion of Ukraine, FIS decided to exclude athletes from Russia and Belarus from FIS competitions, with an immediate effect.

Calendar

Men

Women

Standings

Men's Overall

Women's Overall

References 

2021 in Nordic combined
2022 in Nordic combined
FIS Nordic Combined World Cup
Nordic combined